Thaayillamal Naan Illai is a 1979 Indian Tamil-language film directed by R. Thyagarajan. The film stars Kamal Haasan, Sridevi, Major Sundarrajan and Jai Ganesh, with Rajinikanth and Nagesh in guest roles. It was released on 14 April 1979.

Plot 

Raja, the son of a poor and widowed washerwoman, is well-talented in the arts from his childhood. A man who runs a drama troupe is impressed with Raja's talent and enlists him in this troupe and Raja's mother travels with the troupe as well. While performing in a zameen with the troupe, Raja meets and falls in love with the zamindar's daughter Bhuvana and they engage in a secretive romance assisted by Bhuvana's pet peacock Vadivelan. When the zamindar becomes aware of their relationship, he agrees to get them only married only if Raja cuts all ties with his mother, considering her poor status. Raja refuses and unable to convince her adamant father, Bhuvana elopes with Raja and joins the troupe as well. This enrages the zamindar's villainous nephew Mohan, who had been eyeing the zameen's ownership by marrying Bhuvana. Whether Raja and Bhuvana are able to thwart the odds against them form the rest of the story.

Cast 
Kamal Haasan as Raja
Sridevi as Bhuvana
Rajinikanth as Bichwa Bakri (guest appearance)
Nagesh as Mannargudi Minor (guest appearance)
Jai Ganesh as Mohanasundaram
Major Sundarrajan as Jameen
Thengai Srinivasan as Master of Drama
Sukumari as Sivakami
Madhu Malini as Jaya
Suruli Rajan as Sigamani
Sachu as Servant
V. Gopalakrishnan as Village people
Y. G. Mahendran as Drama artist
Idachappuli Selvaraj as Drama artist
Typist Gopu as Karkoda
Pakoda Kadhar as Kadhar

Production 
Kamal Haasan was given a "curly wig" and he grew a French beard to portray his character. This was the last film in which Haasan, Sridevi and Rajinikanth acted together.

Soundtrack 
All songs are written by Kannadasan and Vaali. Composed by Shankar–Ganesh.

For the dubbed Hindi version, the lyrics were written by Madhukar.

Release 
Thaayillamal Naan Illai was released on 14 April 1979, and ran for over 200 days in theatres. It was dubbed into Hindi as Aakhri Sangram in 1984.

References

External links 
 

1970s Tamil-language films
1979 films
Films about actors
Films about theatre
Films directed by R. Thyagarajan (director)
Films scored by Shankar–Ganesh